Luis Rodrigo was an Argentine actor. He starred in the 1962 film Una Jaula no tiene secretos.

Selected filmography
 La Bailanta (1988)
 The Troublemaker (1950)
 The Orchid (1951)

References

External links

Argentine male film actors